Acer tutcheri, or Tutcher's maple, is a species of deciduous maple tree native to the Fujian, Guangdong, Guangxi, south Hunan, south Jiangxi, and south Zhejiang provinces of southern China, as well as Taiwan and certain districts of Hong Kong.

Acer tutcheri is found in forests between 300 and 1000 metres of altitude. It is a tree up to 15 metres tall, with brown bark. The leaves are up to 9 cm long and 13 cm across, with three or occasionally five lobes. They are deciduous, hairless, thin and papery, and have teeth along the edges.

References

External links
line drawing for Flora of China, figure 558, drawings 2 + 3 at top and left

tutcheri
Trees of China
Plants described in 1908